The Taronga Conservation Society is a Government of New South Wales agency responsible for Taronga Zoo Sydney and the Taronga Western Plains Zoo in New South Wales, Australia. The board is a part of the Australian Regional Association of Zoological Parks. It sponsors a number of research centers, such as the Australian Marine Mammal Research Centre. The agency's role was outlined in the Zoological Parks Board Act 1973 and Amendment Act 1992 and fall within the jurisdiction of the Minister for the Environment and Heritage, who is currently James Griffin.

References

External links
Zoological Parks Board of New South Wales website

Zoological societies
Government agencies of New South Wales
Zoos in New South Wales